Mastaura, was an ancient Greek town near Dereağzı, Nazilli in northern Caria, not to be confused with ancient Mastaura (Lycia).

Some sources speak of the town as originally belonging to Lydia, a kingdom into which Croesus (560-546 BC) briefly incorporated Caria.

Pliny the Elder mentions the town as dependent on Ephesus as its provincial capital and thus as belonging in his time (1st century AD) to the Roman province of Asia 
which, under the Roman Empire, incorporated Caria.

In Severan times the city became rich as evidenced by the impressive buildings.

Location 
Mastaura was situated in the north of ancient Caria, at the foot of Mount Messogis, on the small river Chrysaoras, between Tralles and Tripolis.

The geographer Strabo mentions the town as being in the valley of the Maeander River.

Its site is located near Mastavra in Asian Turkey. On 16 October 1836, William Hamilton visited the ruins, then overgrown with ilex trees, brush and brambles.

Remains
Recently the remains of a Roman-era amphitheatre dating from about 200 AD and holding up to 20,000 spectators have been discovered still standing to a considerable height. It is only the third amphitheatre to be found in Turkey.

Coinage 
Mastaura had the privilege of having a mint and some of its coins are extant.

Bishopric 
Le Quien assigns to the city four named bishops. Theodosius attended both the Council of Ephesus in 431 and the Robber Council of Ephesus in 449. His replacement Sabatius asked Bishop Hesperius of Pitanae to represent him at the Council of Chalcedon in 451. Theodorus took part in the Third Council of Constantinople in 680. Constantinus was one of the fathers of the Second Council of Nicaea in 787. To these four may be added a Baanes who was at the Photian Council of Constantinople (879), but it is unclear whether he was bishop of Mastaura in Asia or of Mastaura in Lycia.

No longer a residential bishopric, Mastaura in Asia is today listed by the Catholic Church as a titular see.

References 

Catholic titular sees in Asia
Populated places in ancient Caria
Roman sites in Turkey
Former populated places in Turkey
Ancient Greek archaeological sites in Turkey
Defunct dioceses of the Ecumenical Patriarchate of Constantinople
Populated places of the Byzantine Empire
Nazilli District
History of Aydın Province